Harry Mussen (4 February 1876 – 8 February 1952) was an Irish cyclist. He competed in the 100km event at the 1908 Summer Olympics for Great Britain.

References

External links
 

1876 births
1952 deaths
British male cyclists
Irish male cyclists
Olympic cyclists of Great Britain
Cyclists at the 1908 Summer Olympics
People from County Antrim